HMS Helena has been the name of several British Royal Navy ships, and may refer to:
 , a 14-gun sloop built in 1775, placed on the sale list in 1779, renamed HMS Helena in 1801 while awaiting sale, and sold in 1802
  was a 14-gun sloop that the Royal Navy purchased in 1778. (She may originally have been a French vessel named Hélene.) The French captured her in September 1778, and took her into service under her existing name, or perhaps as Helene.  recaptured her on 22 June 1779. A storm drove her ashore on the Dutch coast on 3 November 1796; there were no survivors.
 , an 18-gun sloop launched in 1804 and sold in 1814
 , a 10-gun brig-sloop ordered in 1826 but cancelled in 1831
 , a 16-gun brig-sloop launched in 1843, hulked in 1861, and sold in 1921
 , a drifter requisitioned from 1915 to 1919

Citations

References
 
 Demerliac, Alain (1996) La Marine De Louis XVI: Nomenclature Des Navires Français De 1774 À 1792. (Nice: Éditions OMEGA). 
 

Royal Navy ship names